Carmen Louis "Carm" Cozza (June 10, 1930 – January 4, 2018) was an American football and baseball player and coach of football.  He served as the head football coach at Yale University from 1965 to 1996, winning ten Ivy League championships and compiling a record of 179–119–5.  Cozza was named UPI New England Coach of the Year four times and Eastern Coach of the Year.  He was inducted into the College Football Hall of Fame as a coach in 2002.

Biography
Cozza, the son of Italian immigrants, played quarterback at Miami University under coaches Ara Parseghian and Woody Hayes, graduating from Miami in 1952. He was teammates with Bo Schembechler. While at Miami he was a member of Delta Tau Delta International Fraternity. He also played baseball at Miami, and later played for minor league affiliates of the Cleveland Indians and Chicago White Sox.  Cozza was an assistant football coach at Miami from 1956 to 1962 under his fellow Miami alumnus and former teammate, John Pont.  When Pont was named head coach at Yale in 1963, Cozza accompanied him there.  Cozza became head coach at Yale in 1965 after Pont accepted the head coaching job at Indiana University.

Cozza died on January 4, 2018, age 87.

Head coaching record

See also
 1968 Yale vs. Harvard football game

References

External links
 
 
 Cradle of Coaches Archive: A Legacy of Excellence - Carm Cozza, Miami University Libraries

1930 births
2018 deaths
American football quarterbacks
Miami RedHawks baseball players
Miami RedHawks football coaches
Miami RedHawks football players
Yale Bulldogs athletic directors
Yale Bulldogs football coaches
Cedar Rapids Indians players
Fargo-Moorhead Twins players
Superior Blues players
College Football Hall of Fame inductees
People from Parma, Ohio
American people of Italian descent